Tishomingo is the largest city in, and the county seat of, Johnston County, Oklahoma, United States. The population was 3,034 at the 2010 census, a decline of 4.1 percent from the figure of 3,162 in 2000. It was the first capital of the Chickasaw Nation, from 1856 until Oklahoma statehood in 1907. The city is home to Murray State College, a community college with an annual enrollment of 3,015 students. Tishomingo is part of the Texoma region.

History
Tishomingo was named for Tishomingo, who died of smallpox on the Trail of Tears near Little Rock, Arkansas, after the Chickasaws had been removed from their original homelands in and around Tishomingo, Mississippi.

Before the founding of Tishomingo in 1852, the area was known as "Good Springs", for the presence of several springs that made the area a suitable campsite along the road between Fort Washita and Fort Arbuckle. A small town had replaced the old campsites with permanent structures and had been renamed "Tishomingo" by 1856, when it was designated as the Chickasaw capital. A post office was established in 1857.

The Chickasaw Capitol Building was constructed in 1897 from local red granite and officially dedicated in 1898. It housed the tribal governor, the bicameral legislature and other government officials and clerks. The territorial court also met there from time to time. The territorial government was dissolved at statehood. In 1910, the building was sold to Johnston County, becoming the county court house.

The Western Oklahoma Railroad was built from Haileyville to Ardmore via Tishomingo in 1902, and bought by the Chicago, Rock Island and Pacific Railway in the same year. It was abandoned in 1938.

Tishomingo Cemetery dates back to at least 1832. Notables buried there include two former Oklahoma governors, William H. Murray and Johnston Murray, and Chickasaw Nation governors Douglas H. Johnson and Robert M. Harris.

Geography
Tishomingo is located in south-central Johnston County at  (34.235575, -96.677542). U.S. Route 377 runs through the center of the city, leading south  to Madill and north  to Ada. Oklahoma State Highway 22 also passes through the center of Tishomingo, leading southeast  to Kenefic and west  to Ravia.

Pennington Creek flows through the west side of the city, leading south  to the Washita River where it becomes an arm of Lake Texoma. The Tishomingo National Wildlife Refuge, covering the bottomlands of the river and creek valleys, borders the city to the south.

Demographics 

As of the census of 2000, there were 3,162 people, 1,218 households, and 768 families residing in the city. The population density was 671.0 people per square mile (259.2/km). There were 1,407 housing units at an average density of 298.6 per square mile (115.3/km). The racial makeup of the city was 73.12% White, 4.65% African American, 15.24% Native American, 0.44% Asian, 0.03% Pacific Islander, 0.98% from other races, and 5.53% from two or more races. Hispanic or Latino of any race were 3.04% of the population.

There were 1,218 households, out of which 30.8% had children under the age of 18 living with them, 43.8% were married couples living together, 15.0% had a female householder with no husband present, and 36.9% were non-families. 32.3% of all households were made up of individuals, and 16.3% had someone living alone who was 65 years of age or older. The average household size was 2.39 and the average family size was 3.02.

In the city, the population was spread out, with 24.8% under the age of 18, 14.2% from 18 to 24, 22.9% from 25 to 44, 19.8% from 45 to 64, and 18.3% who were 65 years of age or older. The median age was 36 years. For every 100 females, there were 88.4 males. For every 100 females age 18 and over, there were 85.8 males.

The median income for a household in the city was $20,938, and the median income for a family was $28,462. Males had a median income of $25,655 versus $16,957 for females. The per capita income for the city was $14,429. About 21.8% of families and 27.1% of the population were below the poverty line, including 31.6% of those under age 18 and 20.9% of those age 65 or over.

Government
Tishomingo has a home-rule charter form of government, headed by a city manager and city council.

Notable people
 Bill Anoatubby, governor of the Chickasaw Nation
 Neill Armstrong, Chicago Bears head football coach, 1979–1982
 Charles W. Blackwell, first ambassador of the Chickasaw Nation to the United States (1995-2013)
 Linda Hogan, Native American storyteller
 Alfred P. Murrah, federal district and appellate judge
 Blake Shelton, country music singer (current resident)

References

External links
 

Cities in Johnston County, Oklahoma
Cities in Oklahoma
1852 establishments in Indian Territory
County seats in Oklahoma
Former colonial and territorial capitals in the United States
Populated places established in 1852